The National Graphical Association (NGA) was a trade union representing typographers and related workers in the United Kingdom.

History
The union was formed in 1964 by the merger of two long-term rival unions, the Typographical Association and the London Typographical Society.  It was joined by a large number of small craft print unions including the National Society of Electrotypers and Stereotypers, National Union of Press Telegraphists, Association of Correctors of the Press, Amalgamated Society of Lithographic Printers. Society of Lithographic Artists, Designers and Engravers (SLADE) and National Union of Wallcoverings and Allied Trades. By 1982 it had a membership of 136,300.

In 1978 the General Secretary Joe Wade asserted in a letter to the Sunday Times that "recruitment through secondary boycott has been a legitimate trade union tactic for many years."

The NGA merged with the Society of Graphical and Allied Trades in 1991 to form the Graphical, Paper and Media Union.

Election results
The union sponsored several Parliamentary candidates, many of whom won election.

Leadership

General Secretaries
1964: Robert Willis and John Bonfield
1969: John Bonfield
1976: Joe Wade
1982: John Jackson and Joe Wade
1984: Tony Dubbins

General Presidents
1964: Fred Simmons
1974: Les Dixon
1982: Bryn Griffiths

References

External links
Catalogue of the NGA archives, held at the Modern Records Centre, University of Warwick

 
Trade unions established in 1964
Trade unions disestablished in 1991
Defunct trade unions of the United Kingdom
1964 establishments in the United Kingdom
Printing trade unions
Trade unions based in Bedfordshire